Shamsunnahar-Osman Ghani Shikkha Niketon (SOGSN) is a private higher secondary school in Karimganj Upazila, Kishoreganj District, Dhaka Division, Bangladesh. It was established in 2005 by Dr. Osman Faruk and (former Education Minister of Bangladesh, 2001- 2006) and his family member.

History

Beginning
Below is a list of the first teachers at the school, upon its opening.

 Titul Islam (Headmaster)
 Abdul Haque (Assistant Headmaster)

Present
 Rafiqul Alam (Headmaster)
 Habibur Rahman (Assistant Headmaster)

Admission
Usually students are admitted in class 6 and 9. Admission can be considered in other classes if a vacancy is created. The admission test is taken usually in the first week of January.

Class and section system
Each class is divided into two sections — A and B — each containing 50 students.

Uniform
The uniform is a sky blue shirt with full-length navy blue pants for boys.

Co-curricular activities 

There are some clubs and organizations to help co-curricular activities. There is scouting for the school students.

Library
The library has approximately 2,500 books.

Awards
1. 2013 Best school award in Kishoreganj District for SSC result
2. 2014 Best upazila school award (1 lakh taka by Bangladesh govt)  in Karimganj Upazila

Documentary
A Documentary Film named 'Remembering School' by Farhan Alvee (Batch2012) published in 2020. The film is made to recall the memories of School days.

References

External links
 Facebook
 Dhaka Education Board Website for sogsn

High schools in Bangladesh
2005 establishments in Bangladesh